The 2004 Primera B de Chile was the 54th completed season of the Primera B de Chile. 

Deportes Melipilla was the tournament's champions.

Qualification

North Zone

Central Zone

South Zone

Second phase

North Zone

South Zone

Promotion Playoffs

See also
Chilean football league system

References

External links
 RSSSF 2004

Primera B de Chile seasons
Primera B
Chil